Berlin Promotion Agency GmbH & Co.KG (BPA) is a German provider of direct marketing, experiential marketing and event support services. Founded in early 2007 by a group of students around Nissène Krifa (CEO) and Felix Schaal (Chief Operating Officer), the company now employs 4,500 members of staff in Germany and runs branch offices in Berlin and Hamburg.

BPA manages campaigns for international clients in Germany and to date the company has worked with clients from more than 13 countries in Europe, the Middle East, the US and Central Asia. It is also a major supplier of Event Marketing Solutions. The portfolio of the company includes projects for 20th Century Fox, BlackBerry, Fitness First, Lenovo, the UEFA, Adidas and Telefónica Germany.

History 
The company was founded in 2006 as a non-commercial project by students from the Hochschule für Technik und Wirtschaft and the former elite university Freie Universität Berlin. In 2007 the Berlin Promotion Agency was initially registered as a legal entity and was later turned into a Gesellschaft mit beschränkter Haftung when its original founders took charge again. This was followed by continuous national expansion as more students were encouraged to get involved and play a part in the business. At the end of October 2009, the company had established offices in Berlin and Hamburg with more than 7,500 staff members working in the fields of marketing, mystery check and event support.

In October 2010 the Berlin Promotion Agency joined a programme by the Hochschule für Technik und Wirtschaft which enables students to gain practical work experience via a co-operative education programme on-the-job.

Headquarters 
Berlin Promotion Agency, previously located in Charlottenburg-Wilmersdorf in Berlin, moved to its new headquarters on 16 September 2009 and continues its activities at its present location in Berlin-Mitte, the most prominent business borough of Berlin. In 2012 the BPA opened another office in the Western city part again.

The company also has representative offices in Hamburg, Amsterdam and Geneva.

Legal status 
The Berlin Promotion Agency is a privately held company and the shares are held by its former student founders and the managing directors. Its affiliates cover various business areas: promotional services & staff support, marketing consulting, business consulting, business process outsourcing, market research, event management and mystery shopping.

References

External links 
Berlin Promotion Agency National Website (German)
Berlin Promotion Agency (English Version)
Hochschule für Technik und Wirtschaft (English version
Freie Universität Berlin (English version)

Direct marketing
Companies based in Berlin
German companies established in 2007